Gortakeegan is an association football venue in the Republic of Ireland based in Monaghan. It has been the home ground of former League of Ireland club Monaghan United since 1988. The ground has an 800-seater covered stand and an overall capacity of 5,000. Floodlights were added in 1995 and a new stand was officially opened by Mick McCarthy in 1996.

The fourteen acre Gortakeegan complex, which includes four floodlit astro turf pitches, is a designated FAI regional centre.

In 2000, after Monaghan United secured a sponsorship deal with the building firm, Century Homes, the ground became known as Century Homes Park. In 2005 after Century Homes was acquired by the Kingspan Group, the ground became known as Kingspan Century Park. When the sponsorship deal ended the ground reverted to its original name.

During the 2005 season, while Oriel Park was being redeveloped, Dundalk played many of their home games at Gortakeegan.

References

Buildings and structures in Monaghan (town)
Association football venues in the Republic of Ireland
Sports venues in County Monaghan
Monaghan United F.C.